Conifers are a group of cone-bearing seed plants, a subset of gymnosperms. Scientifically, they make up the division Pinophyta, also known as Coniferophyta or Coniferae. The division contains a single extant class, Pinopsida. All extant conifers are perennial woody plants with secondary growth. The great majority are trees, though a few are shrubs. Examples include cedars, Douglas-firs, cypresses, firs, junipers, kauri, larches, pines, hemlocks, redwoods, spruces, and yews. As of 1998, the division Pinophyta was estimated to contain eight families, 68 genera, and 629 living species.

Although the total number of species is relatively small, conifers are ecologically important. They are the dominant plants over large areas of land, most notably the taiga of the Northern Hemisphere, but also in similar cool climates in mountains further south. Boreal conifers have many wintertime adaptations. The narrow conical shape of northern conifers, and their downward-drooping limbs, help them shed snow. Many of them seasonally alter their biochemistry to make them more resistant to freezing. While tropical rainforests have more biodiversity and turnover, the immense conifer forests of the world represent the largest terrestrial carbon sink. Conifers are of great economic value for softwood lumber and paper production.

Evolutionary history

The earliest conifers appear in the fossil record during the Late Carboniferous (Pennsylvanian), over 300 million years ago. Conifers have been suggested to be most closely related to the Cordaitales, a group of Carboniferous-Permian trees and clambering plants whose reproductive structures have some similarities to those of conifers. The most primitive conifers belong to the paraphyletic assemblage of "walchian conifers", which were small trees, and probably originated in dry upland habitats. The range of conifers expanded during the Early Permian (Cisuralian) to lowlands due to increasing aridity. Walchian conifers were gradually replaced by more advanced voltzialean or "transition" conifers. Conifers were largely unaffected by the Permian–Triassic extinction event, and were dominant land plants of the Mesozoic era. Modern groups of conifers emerged from the Voltziales during the Late Permian through Jurassic. Conifers underwent a major decline in the Late Cretaceous corresponding to the explosive adaptive radiation of flowering plants.

Taxonomy and naming

Conifer is a Latin word, a compound of conus (cone) and ferre (to bear), meaning "the one that bears (a) cone(s)".

The division name Pinophyta conforms to the rules of the International Code of Nomenclature for algae, fungi, and plants (ICN), which state (Article 16.1) that the names of higher taxa in plants (above the rank of family) are either formed from the name of an included family (usually the most common and/or representative), in this case Pinaceae (the pine family), or are descriptive. A descriptive name in widespread use for the conifers (at whatever rank is chosen) is Coniferae (Art 16 Ex 2).

According to the ICN, it is possible to use a name formed by replacing the termination -aceae in the name of an included family, in this case preferably Pinaceae, by the appropriate termination, in the case of this division -ophyta. Alternatively, "descriptive botanical names" may also be used at any rank above family. Both are allowed.

This means that if conifers are considered a division, they may be called Pinophyta or Coniferae. As a class, they may be called Pinopsida or Coniferae. As an order they may be called Pinales or Coniferae or Coniferales.

Conifers are the largest and economically most important component group of the gymnosperms, but nevertheless they comprise only one of the four groups. The division Pinophyta consists of just one class, Pinopsida, which includes both living and fossil taxa. Subdivision of the living conifers into two or more orders has been proposed from time to time. The most commonly seen in the past was a split into two orders, Taxales (Taxaceae only) and Pinales (the rest), but recent research into DNA sequences suggests that this interpretation leaves the Pinales without Taxales as paraphyletic, and the latter order is no longer considered distinct. A more accurate subdivision would be to split the class into three orders, Pinales containing only Pinaceae, Araucariales containing Araucariaceae and Podocarpaceae, and Cupressales containing the remaining families (including Taxaceae), but there has not been any significant support for such a split, with the majority of opinion preferring retention of all the families within a single order Pinales, despite their antiquity and diverse morphology.

, the conifers were accepted as composed of seven families, with a total of 65–70 genera and 600–630 species (696 accepted names). The seven most distinct families are linked in the box above right and phylogenetic diagram left. In other interpretations, the Cephalotaxaceae may be better included within the Taxaceae, and some authors additionally recognize Phyllocladaceae as distinct from Podocarpaceae (in which it is included here). The family Taxodiaceae is here included in family Cupressaceae, but was widely recognized in the past and can still be found in many field guides. A new classification and linear sequence based on molecular data can be found in an article by Christenhusz et al.

The conifers are an ancient group, with a fossil record extending back about 300 million years to the Paleozoic in the late Carboniferous period; even many of the modern genera are recognizable from fossils 60–120 million years old. Other classes and orders, now long extinct, also occur as fossils, particularly from the late Paleozoic and Mesozoic eras. Fossil conifers included many diverse forms, the most dramatically distinct from modern conifers being some herbaceous conifers with no woody stems. Major fossil orders of conifers or conifer-like plants include the Cordaitales, Vojnovskyales, Voltziales and perhaps also the Czekanowskiales (possibly more closely related to the Ginkgophyta). 

Multiple studies also indicate that the Gnetophyta belong within the conifers despite their distinct appearances, either placing them as a sister group to Pinales (the 'gnepine' hypothesis) or as being more derived than Pinales but sister to the rest of the group. Most recent studies favor the 'gnepine' hypothesis.

Morphology
All living conifers are woody plants, and most are trees, the majority having monopodial growth form (a single, straight trunk with side branches) with strong apical dominance. Many conifers have distinctly scented resin, secreted to protect the tree against insect infestation and fungal infection of wounds. Fossilized resin hardens into amber. The size of mature conifers varies from less than one metre, to over 100 metres. The world's tallest, thickest, largest, and oldest living trees are all conifers. The tallest is a Coast Redwood (Sequoia sempervirens), with a height of 115.55 metres (although one Victorian mountain ash, Eucalyptus regnans, allegedly grew to a height of 140 metres, although the exact dimensions were not confirmed).  The thickest, meaning the tree with the greatest trunk diameter, is a Montezuma Cypress (Taxodium mucronatum), 11.42 metres in diameter.  The largest tree by three-dimensional volume is a Giant Sequoia (Sequoiadendron giganteum), with a volume 1486.9 cubic metres. The smallest is the pygmy pine (Lepidothamnus laxifolius) of New Zealand, which is seldom taller than 30 cm when mature. The oldest is a Great Basin Bristlecone Pine (Pinus longaeva), 4,700 years old.

Foliage

Since most conifers are evergreens, the leaves of many conifers are long, thin and have a needle-like appearance, but others, including most of the Cupressaceae and some of the Podocarpaceae, have flat, triangular scale-like leaves. Some, notably Agathis in Araucariaceae and Nageia in Podocarpaceae, have broad, flat strap-shaped leaves. Others such as Araucaria columnaris have leaves that are awl-shaped. In the majority of conifers, the leaves are arranged spirally, exceptions being most of Cupressaceae and one genus in Podocarpaceae, where they are arranged in decussate opposite pairs or whorls of 3 (−4).

In many species with spirally arranged leaves, such as Abies grandis (pictured), the leaf bases are twisted to present the leaves in a very flat plane for maximum light capture. Leaf size varies from 2 mm in many scale-leaved species, up to 400 mm long in the needles of some pines (e.g. Apache Pine, Pinus engelmannii). The stomata are in lines or patches on the leaves and can be closed when it is very dry or cold. The leaves are often dark green in colour, which may help absorb a maximum of energy from weak sunshine at high latitudes or under forest canopy shade.

Conifers from hotter areas with high sunlight levels (e.g. Turkish Pine Pinus brutia) often have yellower-green leaves, while others (e.g. blue spruce, Picea pungens) may develop blue or silvery leaves to reflect ultraviolet light. In the great majority of genera the leaves are evergreen, usually remaining on the plant for several (2–40) years before falling, but five genera (Larix, Pseudolarix, Glyptostrobus, Metasequoia and Taxodium) are deciduous, shedding their leaves in autumn. The seedlings of many conifers, including most of the Cupressaceae, and Pinus in Pinaceae, have a distinct juvenile foliage period where the leaves are different, often markedly so, from the typical adult leaves.

Tree ring structure

Tree rings are records of the influence of environmental conditions, their anatomical characteristics record growth rate changes produced by these changing conditions. The microscopic structure of conifer wood consists of two types of cells: parenchyma, which have an oval or polyhedral shape with approximately identical dimensions in three directions, and strongly elongated tracheids. Tracheids make up more than 90% of timber volume. The tracheids of earlywood formed at the beginning of a growing season have large radial sizes and smaller, thinner cell walls. Then, the first tracheids of the transition zone are formed, where the radial size of cells and thickness of their cell walls changes considerably. Finally, the latewood tracheids are formed, with small radial sizes and greater cell wall thickness. This is the basic pattern of the internal cell structure of conifer tree rings.

Reproduction

Most conifers are monoecious, but some are subdioecious or dioecious; all are wind-pollinated. Conifer seeds develop inside a protective cone called a strobilus. The cones take from four months to three years to reach maturity, and vary in size from 2 mm to 600 mm long.

In Pinaceae, Araucariaceae, Sciadopityaceae and most Cupressaceae, the cones are woody, and when mature the scales usually spread open allowing the seeds to fall out and be dispersed by the wind. In some (e.g. firs and cedars), the cones disintegrate to release the seeds, and in others (e.g. the pines that produce pine nuts) the nut-like seeds are dispersed by birds (mainly nutcrackers, and jays), which break up the specially adapted softer cones. Ripe cones may remain on the plant for a varied amount of time before falling to the ground; in some fire-adapted pines, the seeds may be stored in closed cones for up to 60–80 years, being released only when a fire kills the parent tree.

In the families Podocarpaceae, Cephalotaxaceae, Taxaceae, and one Cupressaceae genus (Juniperus), the scales are soft, fleshy, sweet, and brightly colored, and are eaten by fruit-eating birds, which then pass the seeds in their droppings. These fleshy scales are (except in Juniperus) known as arils. In some of these conifers (e.g. most Podocarpaceae), the cone consists of several fused scales, while in others (e.g. Taxaceae), the cone is reduced to just one seed scale or (e.g. Cephalotaxaceae) the several scales of a cone develop into individual arils, giving the appearance of a cluster of berries.

The male cones have structures called microsporangia that produce yellowish pollen through meiosis. Pollen is released and carried by the wind to female cones. Pollen grains from living pinophyte species produce pollen tubes, much like those of angiosperms. The gymnosperm male gametophytes (pollen grains) are carried by wind to a female cone and are drawn into a tiny opening on the ovule called the micropyle. It is within the ovule that pollen-germination occurs. From here, a pollen tube seeks out the female gametophyte, which contains archegonia each with an egg, and if successful, fertilization occurs. The resulting zygote develops into an embryo, which along with the female gametophyte (nutritional material for the growing embryo) and its surrounding integument, becomes a seed. Eventually, the seed may fall to the ground and, if conditions permit, grow into a new plant.

In forestry, the terminology of flowering plants has commonly though inaccurately been applied to cone-bearing trees as well. The male cone and unfertilized female cone are called male flower and female flower, respectively. After fertilization, the female cone is termed fruit, which undergoes ripening (maturation).

It was found recently that the pollen of conifers transfers the mitochondrial organelles to the embryo, a sort of meiotic drive that perhaps explains why Pinus and other conifers are so productive, and perhaps also has bearing on observed sex-ratio bias.

Life cycle
Conifers are heterosporous, generating two different types of spores: male microspores and female megaspores. These spores develop on separate male and female sporophylls on separate male and female cones. In the male cones, microspores are produced from microsporocytes by meiosis. The microspores develop into pollen grains, which contain the male gametophytes. Large amounts of pollen are released and carried by the wind. Some pollen grains will land on a female cone for pollination. The generative cell in the pollen grain divides into two haploid sperm cells by mitosis leading to the development of the pollen tube. At fertilization, one of the sperm cells unites its haploid nucleus with the haploid nucleus of an egg cell. The female cone develops two ovules, each of which contains haploid megaspores. A megasporocyte is divided by meiosis in each ovule. Each winged pollen grain is a four celled male gametophyte. Three of the four cells break down leaving only a single surviving cell which will develop into a female multicellular gametophyte. The female gametophytes grow to produce two or more archegonia, each of which contains an egg. Upon fertilization, the diploid egg will give rise to the embryo, and a seed is produced. The female cone then opens, releasing the seeds which grow to a young seedling.
 To fertilize the ovum, the male cone releases pollen that is carried on the wind to the female cone. This is pollination. (Male and female cones usually occur on the same plant.)
 The pollen fertilizes the female gamete (located in the female cone). Fertilization in some species does not occur until 15 months after pollination.
 A fertilized female gamete (called a zygote) develops into an embryo.
 A seed develops which contains the embryo. The seed also contains the integument cells surrounding the embryo. This is an evolutionary characteristic of the Spermatophyta.
 Mature seed drops out of cone onto the ground.
 Seed germinates and seedling grows into a mature plant.
 When the plant is mature, it produces cones and the cycle continues.

Female reproductive cycles
Conifer reproduction is synchronous with seasonal changes in temperate zones. Reproductive development slows to a halt during each winter season and then resumes each spring. The male strobilus development is completed in a single year. Conifers are classified by three reproductive cycles that refer to the completion of female strobilus development from initiation to seed maturation. All three types of reproductive cycle have a long gap between pollination and fertilization.

One year reproductive cycle:The genera include Abies, Picea, Cedrus, Pseudotsuga, Tsuga, Keteleeria (Pinaceae) and Cupressus, Thuja, Cryptomeria, Cunninghamia and Sequoia (Cupressaceae). Female strobili are initiated in late summer or fall in a year, then they overwinter. Female strobili emerge followed by pollination in the following spring. Fertilization takes place in summer of the following year, only 3–4 months after pollination. Cones mature and seeds are then shed by the end of that same year. Pollination and fertilization occur in a single growing season.

Two-year reproductive cycle:The genera includes  Widdringtonia, Sequoiadendron (Cupressaceae) and most species of Pinus. Female strobilus initials are formed in late summer or fall then overwinter. Female strobili emerge and receive pollen in the first year spring and become conelets. The conelet goes through another winter rest and, in the spring of the 2nd year  archegonia form in the conelet. Fertilization of the archegonia occurs by early summer of the 2nd year, so the pollination-fertilization interval exceeds a year. After fertilization, the conelet is considered an immature cone. Maturation occurs by autumn of the 2nd year, at which time seeds are shed.  In summary, the 1-year and the 2-year cycles differ mainly in the duration of the pollination- fertilization interval.

Three-year reproductive cycle:  Three of the conifer species are pine species (Pinus pinea, Pinus leiophylla, Pinus torreyana) which have pollination and  fertilization events separated by a 2-year interval. Female strobili initiated during late summer or autumn in a year, then overwinter until the following spring. Female strobili emerge then pollination occurs in spring of the 2nd year then the pollinated strobili become conelets in the same year (i.e. the second year). The female gametophytes in the conelet develop so slowly that the megaspore does not go through free-nuclear divisions until autumn of the 3rd year. The conelet then overwinters again in the free-nuclear female gametophyte stage. Fertilization takes place by early summer of the 4th year and seeds mature in the cones by autumn of the 4th year.

Tree development
The growth and form of a forest tree are the result of activity in the primary and secondary meristems, influenced by the distribution of photosynthate from its needles and the hormonal gradients controlled by the apical meristems (Fraser et al. 1964). External factors also influence growth and form.

Fraser recorded the development of a single white spruce tree from 1926 to 1961. Apical growth of the stem was slow from 1926 through 1936 when the tree was competing with herbs and shrubs and probably shaded by larger trees. Lateral branches began to show reduced growth and some were no longer in evidence on the 36-year-old tree. Apical growth totaling about 340 m, 370 m, 420 m, 450 m, 500 m, 600 m, and 600 m was made by the tree in the years 1955 through 1961, respectively. The total number of needles of all ages present on the 36-year-old tree in 1961 was 5.25 million weighing 14.25 kg. In 1961, needles as old as 13 years remained on the tree. The ash weight of needles increased progressively with age from about 4% in first-year needles in 1961 to about 8% in needles 10 years old. In discussing the data obtained from the one 11 m tall white spruce, Fraser et al. (1964) speculated that if the photosynthate used in making apical growth in 1961 was manufactured the previous year, then the 4 million needles that were produced up to 1960 manufactured food for about 600,000 mm of apical growth or 730 g dry weight, over 12 million mm3 of wood for the 1961 annual ring, plus 1 million new needles, in addition to new tissue in branches, bark, and roots in 1960. Added to this would be the photosynthate to produce energy to sustain respiration over this period, an amount estimated to be about 10% of the total annual photosynthate production of a young healthy tree. On this basis, one needle produced food for about 0.19 mg dry weight of apical growth, 3 mm3 wood, one-quarter of a new needle, plus an unknown amount of branch wood, bark and roots.

The order of priority of photosynthate distribution is probably: first to apical growth and new needle formation, then to buds for the next year's growth, with the cambium in the older parts of the branches receiving sustenance last. In the white spruce studied by Fraser et al. (1964), the needles constituted 17.5% of the over-day weight. Undoubtedly, the proportions change with time.

Seed-dispersal mechanism
Wind and animal dispersals are two major mechanisms involved in the dispersal of conifer seeds. Wind born seed dispersal involves two processes, namely;  local neighborhood dispersal (LND) and long-distance dispersal (LDD).
Birds of the crow family, Corvidae, are the primary distributor of the conifer seeds. The birds store the seeds in the soil at depths of  under conditions which favor germination.

Invasive species

A number of conifers originally introduced for forestry have become invasive species in parts of New Zealand, including radiata pine (Pinus radiata), lodgepole pine (P. contorta), Douglas fir (Pseudotsuga mensiezii) and European larch (Larix decidua).

In parts of South Africa, maritime pine (Pinus pinaster), patula pine (P. patula) and radiata pine have been declared invasive species. These wilding conifers are a serious environmental issue causing problems for pastoral farming and for conservation.

Radiata pine was introduced to Australia in the 1870s.  It is "the dominant tree species in the Australian plantation estate" – so much so that many Australians are concerned by the resulting loss of native wildlife habitat. The species is widely regarded as an environmental weed across southeastern and southwestern Australia and the removal of individual plants beyond plantations is encouraged.

Predators
At least 20 species of roundheaded borers of the family Cerambycidae feed on the wood of spruce, fir, and hemlock (Rose and Lindquist 1985). Borers rarely bore tunnels in living trees, although when populations are high, adult beetles feed on tender twig bark, and may damage young living trees. One of the most common and widely distributed borer species in North America is the whitespotted sawyer (Monochamus scutellatus). Adults are found in summer on newly fallen or recently felled trees chewing tiny slits in the bark in which they lay eggs. The eggs hatch in about 2 weeks and the tiny larvae tunnel to the wood and score its surface with their feeding channels. With the onset of cooler weather, they bore into the wood making oval entrance holes and tunnel deeply. Feeding continues the following summer when larvae occasionally return to the surface of the wood and extend the feeding channels generally in a U-shaped configuration. During this time, small piles of frass extruded by the larvae accumulate under logs. Early in the spring of the second year following egg-laying, the larvae, about 30 mm long, pupate in the tunnel enlargement just below the wood surface. The resulting adults chew their way out in early summer, leaving round exit holes, so completing the usual 2-year life cycle.

Cultivation

Conifers – notably Abies (fir), Cedrus, Chamaecyparis lawsoniana (Lawson's cypress), Cupressus (cypress), juniper, Picea (spruce), Pinus (pine), Taxus (yew), Thuja (cedar) – have been the subject of selection for ornamental purposes (for more information see the silviculture page). Plants with unusual growth habits, sizes, and colours are propagated and planted in parks and gardens throughout the world.

Conditions for growth
Conifers can absorb nitrogen in either the ammonium (NH4+) or nitrate (NO3−) form, but the forms are not physiologically equivalent. Form of nitrogen affected both the total amount and relative composition of the soluble nitrogen in white spruce tissues (Durzan and Steward 1967). Ammonium nitrogen was shown to foster arginine and amides and lead to a large increase of free guanidine compounds, whereas in leaves nourished by nitrate as the sole source of nitrogen guanidine compounds were less prominent. Durzan and Steward noted that their results, drawn from determinations made in late summer, did not rule out the occurrence of different interim responses at other times of the year.  Ammonium nitrogen produced significantly heavier (dry weight) seedlings with higher nitrogen content after 5 weeks (McFee and Stone 1968) than did the same amount of nitrate nitrogen. Swan (1960) found the same effect in 105-day-old white spruce.

The general short-term effect of nitrogen fertilization on coniferous seedlings is to stimulate shoot growth more so than root growth (Armson and Carman 1961). Over a longer period, root growth is also stimulated. Many nursery managers were long reluctant to apply nitrogenous fertilizers late in the growing season, for fear of increased danger of frost damage to succulent tissues. A presentation at the North American Forest Tree Nursery Soils Workshop at Syracuse in 1980 provided strong contrary evidence: Bob Eastman, President of the Western Maine Forest Nursery Co. stated that for 15 years he has been successful in avoiding winter “burn” to Norway spruce and white spruce in his nursery operation by fertilizing with 50–80 lb/ac (56–90 kg/ha) nitrogen in September, whereas previously winter burn had been experienced annually, often severely. Eastman also stated that the overwintering storage capacity of stock thus treated was much improved (Eastman 1980).

The concentrations of nutrients in plant tissues depend on many factors, including growing conditions. Interpretation of concentrations determined by analysis is easy only when a nutrient occurs in excessively low or occasionally excessively high concentration. Values are influenced by environmental factors and interactions among the 16 nutrient elements known to be essential to plants, 13 of which are obtained from the soil, including nitrogen, phosphorus, potassium, calcium, magnesium, and sulfur, all used in relatively large amounts (Buckman and Brady 1969). Nutrient concentrations in conifers also vary with season, age, and kind of tissue sampled, and analytical technique. The ranges of concentrations occurring in well-grown plants provide a useful guide by which to assess the adequacy of particular nutrients, and the ratios among the major nutrients are helpful guides to nutritional imbalances.

Economic importance
The softwood derived from conifers is of great economic value, providing about 45% of the world's annual lumber production. Other uses of the timber include the production of paper and plastic from chemically treated wood pulp. Some conifers also provide foods such as pine nuts and juniper berries, the latter used to flavor gin.

References

Bibliography

External links

 Conifers at the Tree of Life Web Project
 300 million-year-old conifer in Illinois – 4/2007
 World list of conifer species from Conifer Database by A. Farjon in the Catalogue of Life
 Tree browser for conifer families and genera via the Catalogue of Life
 Royal Horticultural Society Encyclopedia of Conifers: A Comprehensive Guide to Cultivars and Species
 DendroPress: Conifers Around the World.
 

 
Extant Pennsylvanian first appearances
Plant divisions